Ehalkivi is an erratic boulder in Letipea, Lääne-Viru County, Estonia; for its volume is the largest of kind in Estonia, and one of the largest of kind in the glaciation area of North Europe.

Geologically the boulder is pegmatite.

Dimensions

 Height: 7.6 m
 Circumference: 49.6 (measured at 1.5 m from water surface)
 Volume: 930 m3
 Mass: ca 2,500 t

References

External links

Viru-Nigula Parish
Glacial erratics of Estonia